The fourteenth series of the British science fiction television programme Doctor Who is set to premiere in 2024, with a festive episode to precede it in late 2023. It will be the fifth series led by Russell T Davies as head writer and executive producer, and the first since his return to the show, having previously worked on it from 2005 to 2010. This series is set to be the fourteenth to air following the programme's revival in 2005, and will be the fortieth season overall. The fourteenth series was announced with Davies' return to the programme for its 60th anniversary in 2023 and beyond.

The eight-episode series will introduce Ncuti Gatwa as the Fifteenth Doctor, a new incarnation of the Doctor, an alien Time Lord who travels through time and space in the TARDIS, which appears to be a British police box on the outside. The series also introduces Millie Gibson as the Doctor's newest companion, Ruby Sunday. Filming began in December 2022, with production moving from Roath Lock Studios to Wolf Studios after Bad Wolf became a co-producer of the series.

Episodes

Casting

In July 2021, Jodie Whittaker announced her intention to leave the programme as the Thirteenth Doctor following the thirteenth series and three associated specials, to air by 2022. Mandip Gill and John Bishop who portrayed Yasmin Khan and Dan Lewis later stated that they were unsure if they would continue starring following the 2022 specials but Gill confirmed her departure from the show on 3 May 2022. Davies confirmed that auditions for the fourteenth series would begin in late 2021.

On 8 May 2022, Ncuti Gatwa was announced as Jodie Whittaker's successor as the programme's lead, and many reports, including that of the BBC itself stated he would play the Fourteenth Doctor and that Whittaker's Thirteenth Doctor would regenerate into an incarnation portrayed by Gatwa.  Casting director Andy Pryor assisted in the casting of Gatwa. Upon Whittaker's final appearance as the character, she instead regenerated into a form seemingly identical to the Tenth Doctor. This character, portrayed by David Tennant, was confirmed to be the Fourteenth Doctor, with later clarification that Gatwa would actually portray the Fifteenth Doctor. Auditions for the next companion took place on 24 September 2022. On 18 November 2022, during Children in Need, Millie Gibson was announced as the new companion Ruby Sunday.

On 9 January 2023, the BBC announced that Aneurin Barnard would appear as Roger ap Gwilliam, and that Jemma Redgrave, having reprised her role in the previous series would continue to appear as Kate Stewart during the fourteenth series. On 20 January 2023, further casting announcements from the BBC revealed that Anita Dobson and Michelle Greenidge would appear in undisclosed roles.

Production

Development
In May 2017, it was announced that due to the terms of a deal between BBC Worldwide and SMG Pictures in China, the company has first right of refusal on the purchase for the Chinese market of future series of the programme until and including Series 15. In October 2019, a deal was made between HBO Max and BBC for an additional two series of Doctor Who, including the thirteenth and fourteenth series.

On 29 July 2021, the BBC announced that Chris Chibnall, who served as executive producer and showrunner of the series for the Thirteenth Doctor, would depart the series after a run of specials in 2022. In the BBC press release, Chibnall is quoted as saying: "I wish our successors - whoever the BBC and BBC Studios choose - as much fun as we've had. They're in for a treat!" The new series was first teased by Piers Wenger on 25 August 2021, when he said an upcoming change for Doctor Who would be "radical".

On 24 September 2021, the BBC announced Russell T Davies would return to Doctor Who as showrunner, after having previously acted as showrunner from 2005–2010 for the Ninth and Tenth Doctor. He will succeed Chibnall for the show's 60th anniversary in 2023 and beyond. Davies will be joined by the Bad Wolf production company, which was founded by former Doctor Who executive producer Julie Gardner and former BBC head of drama Jane Tranter. In October 2021, it was announced that Sony would acquire a majority of Bad Wolf. Bad Wolf also took over creative control of Doctor Who beginning with the series allowing the BBC to focus on establishing Doctor Who as a global brand.

Phil Collinson returned to the show as producer, having previously produced episodes from 2005–2008. By January 2022, according to the CV of block producer Vicki Delow, it stated that series 14 was "currently in production"; Davies confirmed by March 2022 that production had begun at Bad Wolf Studios in Cardiff. William Oswald is also editing for the new series, having last edited for Doctor Who in "Twice Upon a Time" (2017).

Writing
Steven Moffat, who served as a writer on the series from 2005–2017 and showrunner from 2010–2017 for the Eleventh and Twelfth Doctor, commented in December 2021 that he had talked with Davies about his plans for the series. In December 2021, Davies confirmed that he had already written some episodes, and in November 2022, he was quoted in Doctor Who Magazine as having written a further special episode outside of the 60th anniversary specials. In December 2022, Davies further stated in Doctor Who Magazine that the series would consist of eight episodes, to be followed by a further festive special. On 12 February 2022, Davies was quoted on the Michael Ball show on BBC Radio 2 stating that the fourth episode was "one of the greatest things I've ever made in my life".

Filming
Filming for the series is set to mark a change in the studio location, with the new studio, Wolf Studios, taking over from Roath Lock Studios as the company for in-house filming, where the series has filmed since 2012. This change came about as Bad Wolf was set to co-produce along with the BBC going forward. Bad Wolf further filed for a new subsidiary company, also run by Gardner, called "Whoniverse1 LTD".

Pre-production for the series commenced on 26 September 2022, and filming began on 5 December. Dylan Holmes Williams directed the first block, consisting of the fourth and fifth episodes. Mark Tonderai directed the second block, consisting of the 2023 festive special, having previously directed the eleventh series episodes "The Ghost Monument" and "Rosa" (both 2018). Julie Anne Robinson directed the third production block.

Production blocks are arranged as follows:

Release
The series is set to be preceded by up to three specials to begin airing in November 2023 marking Davies' return and the show's 60th anniversary. Gatwa's first full episode will premiere "over the festive period in 2023", and the fourteenth series will be screened in 2024.

The series will be released internationally on Disney+; the BBC and Disney Branded Television were in talks regarding the partnership in July 2022, and it was announced in October.

References

Series 14
Series 14
Upcoming television seasons